Jimmie R. Yee (born 1934) is an American politician who formerly served on the Sacramento County Board of Supervisors. Yee was briefly mayor of Sacramento, California after the death of Mayor Joe Serna in 1999. Yee is a Democrat.

Early life and education 
Yee was born in Sacramento, California. He earned a Bachelor of Science degree in civil engineering from the University of California, Berkeley, graduating in 1956.

Career
After attending college, Jimmie Yee entered the United States Army Reserve. Approximately ten years later, he was discharged. Prior to entering politics, Yee worked as a structural and civil engineer in Northern California. He founded one of the Sacramento Valley's largest consulting engineering firms, Cole/Yee/Schubert and Associates, and provided design services for many Sacramento buildings.

Yee, a Sacramento City Planning commissioner was elected to the 4th district city council seat in 1992 after Tom Chinn announced his retirement. Yee was re-elected to a second four-year term in 1996 and to a third term in 2000.

Shortly after winning his third term, Yee was appointed mayor by the City Council to fill the unexpired term of Joe Serna Jr., one week after Serna's death on December 14, 1999. He remained in office until November 27, 2000, when Heather Fargo was sworn in.

In 2006, Yee announced his candidacy for the Sacramento County Board of Supervisors after longtime supervisor Illa Collin announced that she was retiring. Since Yee won over fifty percent of the vote in the nonpartisan primary in June of that year, Yee did not have to run in the November general election. Yee served as vice chair in 2007 and chair in 2008. He left the Board of Supervisors in 2015.

Personal life 
Yee has been married to his wife, Mary, for 50 years. They have six children and seventeen grandchildren.

References

Sources
Jimmie R. Yee – District 2
Seismic Safety Commission
Political Leaders

External links
Sacramento County Board of Supervisors

1934 births
Living people
American civil engineers
Mayors of Sacramento, California
Sacramento County Supervisors
Sacramento City Council members
American mayors of Chinese descent
California politicians of Chinese descent
California Democrats
UC Berkeley College of Engineering alumni
Engineers from California
Asian-American city council members